The 1972 Soviet football championship was the 40th seasons of competitive football in the Soviet Union and the 34th among teams of sports societies and factories. Zaria Voroshilovgrad won the championship becoming the Soviet domestic champions for the first time.

Honours

Notes = Number in parentheses is the times that club has won that honour. * indicates new record for competition

Soviet Union football championship

Top League

First League

Second League (finals)

 [Nov 4-18, Sochi]

Additional Play-Off
 [Nov 22, 25]
 SPARTAK Ivano-Frankovsk  0-1 3-1  Daugava Riga

Top goalscorers

Top League
Oleg Blokhin (Dinamo Kiev) – 14 goals

First League
Berador Abduraimov (Pakhtakor Tashkent) – 34 goals

References

External links
 1972 Soviet football championship. RSSSF